The 2015 Novak Djokovic tennis season is considered as one of the greatest seasons of all time by an individual tennis player. Selected achievements/records from this season are: winning 3 Major titles, becoming only the third man to reach all four major finals in an Open Era season (after Rod Laver and Roger Federer), reigning as world number 1 for all 52 weeks of the year, winning a record 6 Masters 1000 tournaments, claiming the ATP World Tour Finals, reaching the final of 8 Masters 1000 tournaments, reaching a record 15 consecutive finals, a record 31 victories against players ranked in the top 10 at the time of the match and earning a record breaking amount of prize money. Djokovic had an impressive 15-4 record against the other 3 members of men's tennis's Big Four, including a 4-0 record versus Rafael Nadal, 5-3 against Roger Federer and 6-1 record against Andy Murray. Beyond that, he also finished the season with a 16-4 record against Top-5 players.

Analysis 
Some experts consider it the greatest season ever in men's tennis.

Year summary

Grand Slams 
Djokovic reached the final of the 2015 Australian Open after beating Milos Raonic in the quarterfinals and defending champion Stan Wawrinka in the semifinals. He then defeated Andy Murray in the final, earning him a fifth Australian Open title, an Open Era record.

At the French Open, Djokovic reached the final by defeating arch-rival Rafael Nadal in the quarterfinals (becoming only the second man to beat Nadal at Roland Garros) and Andy Murray in the semifinals, but was defeated in the final by Stan Wawrinka to end a 28-match win streak and prevent Djokovic from completing the career Grand Slam.

At the 2015 Wimbledon Championships, he started his title defense by beating Philipp Kohlschreiber, Jarkko Nieminen, and Bernard Tomic in the first three rounds. In the fourth round, Djokovic dropped the first two sets before coming back to beat Kevin Anderson in five.  He then went on to beat Marin Čilić and Richard Gasquet in straight sets to meet Roger Federer in the final, a repeat of last year's final. Djokovic would again prevail in 4 sets, giving him his 9th major and second major of the year, the first time he won multiple majors in a calendar year since 2011.

At the US Open, Djokovic reached the final by beating Feliciano López in the quarterfinals and soundly beating Marin Čilić in the semifinals, losing only three games in the entire match. In the final he trumped Roger Federer in a four setter to win the title. Djokovic knocked out the defending champion of every major other than Wimbledon, where he was reigning champion and knocked out 2014's runner up.

2015 was the first time in Djokovic's career that he reached the final of all four grand slams and winning 3 out of 4, with the only loss coming at the French Open to Stan Wawrinka.  He repeated the feat in 2021, reaching all 4 finals and winning 3, that time, the only loss was at the US Open to Daniil Medvedev.

Other tournaments 
Djokovic began the year with a warm-up tournament at the World Tennis Championship, but later withdrew from his final against Andy Murray. He then began his season in Doha, Qatar. Djokovic's next tournament was the 2015 Dubai Tennis Championships in late February where he reached the semifinals in 2014 losing to Roger Federer. Djokovic however lost to Federer 3–6, 5–7. He met Federer again in the final of the 2015 BNP Paribas Open at Indian Wells and won in three sets. Djokovic then competed in the 2015 Miami Open and won the tournament for the fifth time after defeating Andy Murray in the final in three sets.

In the clay season, Djokovic competed in the 2015 Monte-Carlo Rolex Masters and won the tournament for the second time after defeating Marin Čilić in the quarterfinals, Rafael Nadal in the semi-finals, and Tomáš Berdych in the final, thus extending his winning streak to 17 matches. He also won his 23rd Masters title, tying Roger Federer. Djokovic withdrew from the Madrid Open to rest for the Italian Open and the French Open. After withdrawing from Madrid, Djokovic won his fourth Rome title at the 2015 Internazionali BNL d'Italia by defeating Roger Federer in the final in straight sets, thus extending his winning streak to 22 matches.

In the summer hard court season, Djokovic competed in both the 2015 Rogers Cup and the 2015 Western & Southern Open where he reached the final in both tournaments. In the former, Djokovic lost to Andy Murray in three sets, ending his 8 match winning streak against Murray, while in the latter, Djokovic lost to Roger Federer in two sets, ending his 3 match winning streak against Federer, as well as ending his quest for a complete set of Masters 1000 titles. After the US Open, during the fall Asian swing, Djokovic won his sixth China Open title and his third Shanghai Masters title, winning all his matches in straight sets. After winning in Shanghai, Djokovic won his sixth masters title of the year at the 2015 BNP Paribas Masters defeating Andy Murray in the final for his sixth win of the season against Murray.

Djokovic became the only player to beat each player from the top 10 in the 2015 tennis season.

All matches
This table lists all the matches of Djokovic this year, including walkovers W/O (they are marked ND for non-decision)

Singles matches

Doubles matches

Exhibitions

Singles

Tournament schedule

Singles schedule

Doubles schedule

Yearly records

Head-to-head matchups
Novak Djokovic has a  record against the top 10,  against the top 11–50,  against other players;  against right-handed players and  against left-handed players.
Ordered by number of wins (Bolded number marks a top 10 player at the time of first match of the year, Italic means top 50; "L" means left-handed player).

Finals

Singles: 15 (11 titles, 4 runners-up)

Earnings
Bold font denotes tournament win

source：Novak Djokovic ATP Profile

Awards and nominations
 Laureus World Sports Award for Sportsman of the Year
 ATP World Tour Player of the Year
 Best Male Tennis Player ESPY Award
 ITF Men's World Champion
 Best Sportsman by Olympic Committee of Serbia
 Golden Badge of DSL Sport
 Eurosport International Athlete of the Year

See also
 2015 ATP World Tour
 2015 Roger Federer tennis season
 2015 Rafael Nadal tennis season
 2015 Andy Murray tennis season
 2015 Stan Wawrinka tennis season

References

External links
  
 ATP tour profile

Novak Djokovic tennis seasons
Djokovic
2015 in Serbian sport